CommonSpirit Health is the largest Catholic health system, and the second-largest nonprofit hospital chain, in the United States (as of 2019). It operates more than 700 care sites and 142 hospitals in 21 states. Founded in 2019 by the merger of Dignity Health and Catholic Health Initiatives, CommonSpirit Health formed as one of the largest non-profit hospital systems by revenue in the United States.

History
Formed on February 1, 2019, the hospital network was created by the merger of two nonprofit hospital systems: San Francisco-based Dignity Health, and Catholic Health Initiatives of Colorado.

Dignity Health was founded in 1986 as Catholic Healthcare West, when the Sisters of Mercy Burlingame Regional Community and the Sisters of Mercy Auburn Regional Community merged their healthcare ministries into one organization. Catholic Health Initiatives began operations in 1996. The founding systems were the Catholic Health Corporation of Omaha, Nebraska, the Franciscan Health System of Aston, Pennsylvania, and the Sisters of Charity Health Care Systems of Cincinnati, Ohio.

CommonSpirit reported operating losses of $227 million in the first quarter of 2020, while combining Dignity Health and Catholic Health Initiatives into a single organization.

In February 2021, CommonSpirit, along with 13 other health care systems such as Trinity Health and Tenet, have combined to launch a data analytics company, Truveta.

Performance
On  October 8, 2022  Kelsay Irby the Emergency Room Charge Nurse at St. Michael’s Medical Center in Silverdale, Washington called dispatchers at Kitsap 911  asking for help from local firefighters to come and relieve some of the pressure as they were operating at less than 50% of their ideal staffing grid.  Kitsap Fire and Rescue sent an emergency services crew to the hospital to monitor patients in the lobby, retake their vitals and do roll calls.  The chair of the Kitsap County Fire Chiefs Association has met with hospital leadership twice regarding the delays for ambulances dropping off patients.

Leadership
Lloyd H. Dean and Kevin E. Lofton served as joint CEOs for the health system from its founding, in early 2019. Prior, Dean was CEO and president at Dignity Health, and Lofton was CEO of Catholic Health Initiatives. Lofton retired at the end of June 2020, leaving Dean as sole CEO. In 2022, Dean retired and was succeeded as CEO by Wright L. Lassiter III, previously of Henry Ford Health.

References

Christian charities based in the United States
Hospital networks in the United States
Catholic health care
Catholic charities
Religious corporations
2019 establishments in the United States
Companies based in Chicago
Hospitals established in 2019
Dignity Health
Healthcare in the United States
Privately held companies of the United States
Charities based in Illinois
Non-profit corporations
Catholic hospital networks in the United States